Flavius Anicius Olybrius may refer to:
 Flavius Anicius Olybrius, Roman Emperor
 Anicius Hermogenianus Olybrius, Roman politician

Anicii